Hathawekela (also spelled Oawikila, Thaawikila, Thawegila, Shawnee: θawikila, French: Chalaqua) was one of the five divisions (or bands) of the Shawnee, a Native American people during the 18th century. The other four divisions were the Chalahgawtha, Mekoche, Kispoko, and Pekowi. (All five division names have been spelled in a great variety of ways.) Together these divisions formed the loose confederacy that was the Shawnee tribe.

Traditionally, Shawnee political leadership came from the Hathawekela patrilineal division.

According to J.D. Lewis, "Tradition and the known linguistic connections of the Shawnee indicate that they had migrated to the Cumberland River Valley from the north not long previous to the historic period ... Shortly after 1674, the Hathawekela or that part of the Shawnee afterward so called, settled upon Savannah River, and in 1681 they proved of great assistance to the new colony of South Carolina by driving a tribe known as Westo, probably part of the Yuchi, from the middle Savannah."

They emigrated from the South "about 1697, together with other Shawnee bands, and settled with them, partly on Susquehanna and partly on Allegheny River, Pa., where they are mentioned in 1731. Sewickley, Pa., probably takes its name from them ... The Hathawekela claim to be the "elder brothers" among the Shawnee, as being the first created of the tribe. The band formerly under Black Bob, are a portion of this division."

References

Native American tribes in West Virginia
Shawnee history